Algoid may refer to:

things relating to algae
a fictional monster in the Dungeons & Dragons role-playing game
Algoid (programming language), 2012 educational programming language